"One Love" is a non-album single by The Stone Roses. The single was released in the UK, U.S., Australia, Brazil, Germany, Japan, Spain, and France, peaking at #4 in the Roses' home country of the UK, their highest charting single up until that time. "One Love" has appeared on the compilation albums Turns into Stone, The Complete Stone Roses and The Very Best of The Stone Roses.

The song was used in an episode of the popular British television series Shameless. In the scene in which the song appears, Frank Gallagher is seen dancing in the pub with his shirt over his head as he is drunk and high on ecstasy.

It is believed that John Squire played a Custom Fender Jaguar guitar with a variety of flanging and wahwah effect pedals to create the song's distinctive sound.

Ian Brown on "One Love": "The chorus wasn't strong enough. We tried for an anthem. We wanted to cover all bases and ended up covering none."

Track listing

UK release

7" vinyl (Silvertone ORE 17)
 "One Love" – 3:35
 "Something's Burning" – 7:50

12" vinyl (Silvertone ORE T 17) Cassette (Silvertone ORE C 17) CD (Silvertone ORE CD 17)
 "One Love" – 7:45
 "Something's Burning" – 7:50

US release

12" vinyl (Silvertone 1399-1-JD) Cassette (Silvertone 1399-4-JS) CD digipak (Silvertone 1399-2-JS)
 "One Love" – 7:45
 "Something's Burning" – 7:50
 "One Love" (7" version) – 3:35

Japanese release

CD (Silvertone/Alfa ALCB-103)
 "One Love" – 3:35
 "One Love" (12" version) – 7:45
 "Something's Burning" – 7:50
(Track 3 incorrectly listed as "Something' Burning")

Charts

References

External links
The Definitive Stone Roses Discography entry

1990 singles
The Stone Roses songs
Song recordings produced by John Leckie
Songs written by John Squire
1990 songs